Gargrave is a railway station on the Bentham Line, which runs between  and  via . It is owned by Network Rail and managed by Northern Trains.

History
The station was opened on 30 July 1849 by the "Little" North Western Railway, later taken over by the Midland Railway. The original stone shelters survive on each platform, but the main wooden station building is now in private use.

Stationmasters

Peter William ca. 1851
W. Renshaw until 1861 (afterwards station master at Berkley Road)
John Bell 1861 - ca. 1866
W. Lewin (formerly station master at Oxenhope)
Thomas Stone ca. 1871 - 1893 
David Bennett Smith 1893 - 1901 (afterwards station master at Manningham)
James Staff 1901 - 1920 (formerly station master at Oxenhope)

Facilities
It is unstaffed and until 2019 had no ticket machine (so travellers had to buy tickets in advance or on the train).  A new ticket machine has now been installed, along with digital information screens as part of an ongoing station upgrade process by train operator first announced back in 2016. Train running information is also provided by timetable posters and telephone.

Step-free access is only possible for southbound travellers, as the northbound platform can only be reached via steps from the road bridge.

Pennine Way 
The Pennine Way, a long-distance path, crosses the railway a few hundred yards to the west of the station.

Services 

The service level from here in both directions was increased at the May 2018 timetable change, as a consequence of the 2015 Northern franchise award to Arriva Rail North. The improvements included two additional trains each way on the Leeds - Lancaster route on weekdays and an extra train on Sundays - these began operating on 20 May 2018 with the start of the summer timetable.

Five of the Lancaster trains continue to Morecambe, but the daily direct Heysham train has now ceased on weekdays (though it does run on a Sunday since the winter 2019 timetable update). Southbound there are thirteen departures to Leeds, plus a single late evening departure to Skipton only (though this has a connection to Leeds from there).

Eight trains each way call on Sundays (five to Lancaster and Morecambe, three to Carlisle northbound).

References

Sources

External links 
 
 

Craven District
DfT Category F2 stations
Railway stations in North Yorkshire
Former Midland Railway stations
Railway stations in Great Britain opened in 1849
Northern franchise railway stations
1849 establishments in England